Tubli is a village in Bahrain. Tubli is located in the east of Bahrain island and west of Sitra island. It is also situated next to the capital of Bahrain, Manama. Tubli Bay is named after the village.

External links 
 Tubli.Com

Populated places in the Central Governorate, Bahrain